One Does Not Play with Love is a 1926 silent German drama film directed by G. W. Pabst. The film is an adaptation of the 1834 play by Alfred de Musset, On ne badine pas avec l'amour. The film is considered to be a lost film.

Cast
 Werner Krauss as Fürst Colalto (Prince Colalto)
 Lili Damita as Calixta
 Erna Morena as Florence, ehemalige Opernsängerin (alumna opera singer)
 Egon von Jordan as Eugen Lewis
 Artur Retzbach as Nepallek, Hofmobiliardirektor (Director of the furniture of the court) (as Artur Retzbach-Erasiny)
 Oreste Bilancia as Der Freund (the friend)
 Gustav Czimeg
 Tala Birell as Bit Role (as Thala Birell)
 Karl Etlinger
 Maria Paudler
 Mathilde Sussin

See also
List of lost films

References

External links

1926 films
1926 drama films
German silent feature films
German black-and-white films
Films directed by G. W. Pabst
Films of the Weimar Republic
Lost German films
Films produced by Arnold Pressburger
German films based on plays
Films based on works by Alfred de Musset
Films set in the 1910s
Films set in Vienna
Phoebus Film films
1926 lost films
Lost drama films
1920s German-language films